Matthew Paul Brookman (born 1968) is an American lawyer from Indiana who serves as a United States magistrate judge of the United States District Court for the Southern District of Indiana. He is a nominee to serve as a United States district judge of the same court.

Education 

Brookman earned a Bachelor of Arts from DePauw University in 1990 and a Juris Doctor from the Washington University School of Law in 1993. Brookman also studied abroad at the University of Essex in Colchester, England.

Career 

Brookman began his legal career as an associate for Brown & James in St. Louis, Missouri, from 1993 to 1994. From 1994 to 1997, he was a state court prosecutor in Jefferson County, Missouri. From 1997 to 1999, he was an associate at the law firm Herzog, Crebs & McGhee. From 1999 to 2002, he was a special assistant United States attorney in the U.S. Attorney's Office for the Western District of Missouri and from 2002 to 2016, he was an assistant United States attorney in the U.S. Attorney's Office for the Southern District of Indiana. Brookman served as the Chief of the office's Drug and Violent Crime unit and lead Organized Crime and Drug Enforcement Task Force attorney. From 2008 to 2010, he was a part-time adjunct professor teaching an introduction to law course to
undergraduate students at the University of Southern Indiana. From 2011 to 2015, he was a part-time adjunct professor teaching an introduction to constitutional law to undergraduate students at the University of Evansville.

Notable cases 

In 2010, Judge Brookman received the Director’s Award from United States Attorney General Eric Holder for his work on the United States v. Jarvis Brown. Brown was prosecuted for quadruple homicide.

Federal judicial service

United States Magistrate Judge service 

Brookman was appointed as a United States Magistrate Judge of the United States District Court for the Southern District of Indiana on September 14, 2015, to fill the vacancy left by the retirement of Judge William G. Hussmann, who retired on January 31, 2016. He assumed office on February 1, 2016.

Nomination to District Court 

On December 21, 2022, President Joe Biden announced his intent to nominate Brookman to serve as a United States district judge of the United States District Court for the Southern District of Indiana. On January 3, 2023, his nomination was sent to the Senate. President Biden nominated Brookman to the seat to be vacated by Judge Richard L. Young, who will assume senior status upon confirmation of a successor. On January 25, 2023, a hearing on his nomination was held before the Senate Judiciary Committee. On March 9, 2023, his nomination was reported out of committee by a voice vote. His nomination is pending before the United States Senate.

References 

1968 births
Living people
20th-century American lawyers
21st-century American judges
21st-century American lawyers
Assistant United States Attorneys
DePauw University alumni
Indiana lawyers
Lawyers from St. Louis
Missouri lawyers
United States magistrate judges
University of Evansville faculty
University of Southern Indiana faculty
Washington University School of Law alumni